Mohammad Jafar Montazeri (born 1949 in Qom) is an Iranian cleric and judge and the current attorney-general of Iran since 1 April 2016. He was previously head of Iran's Administrative Justice Court and Special Clerical Court.

References 

1949 births
Living people
People from Qom
Iranian prosecutors
Iranian Shia clerics
Combatant Clergy Association politicians